Word Party (also known as Jim Henson's Word Party) is an American CGI animated children's streaming television series that began airing on Netflix in 2016. The series was created by The Jim Henson Company using Henson Digital Puppetry Studio.

Overview
The vocabulary-building program features a group of five young animals, Kip the Wallaby (John Tartaglia), Bailey the Elephant (Victor Yerrid), leader Franny the Cheetah (Donna Kimball), the mascot Lulu the Panda (Dorien Davies), and Tilly the Tortoise (Alice Dinnean), "as they sing, dance and play." The show invites young viewers to help teach the baby animals new words, practice these new words themselves, and celebrate these achievements with a "Word Party!", hence the series' title name. The show is narrated by Patina Miller.

Characters 
Main
 Lulu is a baby panda who is the youngest of the group and the title character of the series. Due to being younger than the other babies (and older than Tilly), it is often hard for her to fully express how she is feeling because it is harder for her to find the necessary words for what she wants to say. She occasionally does not speak in full sentences and gets frustrated when others can not understand her.
 Kip is a baby wallaby who is the jokester of the group and loves to jump. Sometimes when he tries to guess what the other babies are feeling, or what someone else is trying to tell him, he often has trouble finding out what it is, with him comically and humorously failing. With help from the other babies, and Word Wally, he has the words for what someone else is talking about. He is the second oldest of the group. 
 Franny is a baby cheetah who is Lulu's best friend and the leader of the group. Sometimes it is hard for the others to tell what is bothering her when she is in a low mood, but she accepts help when she needs it most. She has stated several times, "Well, I am the oldest."
 Bailey is a baby elephant who loves to pretend. He has a big heart, and often helps the other babies when they do not always have the words to express their feelings. He cares a lot about the other babies.
 Tilly is a Mandarin-speaking baby tortoise who appears as a main character in season 4. Due to being the youngest of the group alongside Lulu, she is often soft-spoken and does not talk very much, though words cannot always describe her sunny disposition. She is the smallest of the babies.

Episodes

Season 1 (2016)

Season 2 (2016)

Season 3 (2017)

Season 4 (2020)

Season 5 (2021)

Word Party Presents: Math!
Word Party Presents: Math! is a spinoff that teaches math. It was released on Netflix on December 28, 2021. A sneak peek of the spinoff was uploaded on the Netflix Jr channel on December 1, 2021. It introduces new friends to the series, Cookitybot and Math Molly.

Episodes

See also
 List of original programs distributed by Netflix

References

External links 
 

2010s American animated television series
2020s American animated television series
2010s American children's television series
2020s American children's television series
2016 American television series debuts
2021 American television series endings
American children's animated adventure television series
American computer-animated television series
American preschool education television series
American television shows featuring puppetry
Animated preschool education television series
2010s preschool education television series
2020s preschool education television series
Netflix children's programming
Television series by The Jim Henson Company
Animated television series about cats
Animated television series about children
Animated television series about elephants
Animated television series about turtles
Television series about kangaroos and wallabies
Television series about pandas
Reading and literacy television series
English-language Netflix original programming